Bob's Baby is a 1913 American comedy film.

Plot
Bob, a typically devoted husband, is told by his wife that the stork has paid a visit to their household; the first time, it turns out to be a puppy; the second time, expecting another canine, he is surprised to find the more traditional offspring.

Cast

1913 films
American silent short films
American black-and-white films
Silent American comedy films
1913 comedy films
1913 short films
American comedy short films
1910s American films